Shamarikh is a village in northern Aleppo Governorate, northwestern Syria.

The village administratively belongs to Nahiya Azaz in Azaz District. Nearby localities include Shamarin  to the north and Tulayl ash-Sham  to the west. In the 2004 census, Shamarikh had a population of 226.

References

Populated places in Aleppo Governorate